Jailhouse Rock is a  elevation summit located in Capitol Reef National Park, in Wayne County of Utah, United States. South Desert is a long, narrow valley that runs parallel to the strike of the Waterpocket Fold monocline. Cathedral Valley was so named in 1945 by Charles Kelly, first superintendent of Capitol Reef National Monument, because the valley's sandstone monoliths reminded early explorers of ornate, Gothic cathedrals, with fluted walls, alcoves, and pinnacles. The hiking approach to the base of this large promontory rising from the valley floor is made from the Lower South Desert Overlook via a switchback trail until it disappears along the valley floor. Precipitation runoff from this feature is drained by Deep Creek, a tributary of the Fremont River, which in turn is within the Colorado River drainage basin.

Geology
Jailhouse Rock is composed of reddish Entrada Sandstone with a hard, grayish-green sandstone and siltstone Curtis Formation layer caprock which protects it from erosion. The sandstone, which was originally deposited as sandy mud on a tidal flat, is believed to have formed about 160 million years ago during the Jurassic period as a giant sand sea, the largest in Earth's history. Long after these sedimentary rocks were deposited, the Colorado Plateau was uplifted relatively evenly, keeping the layers roughly horizontal, but Capitol Reef is an exception because of the Waterpocket Fold, a classic monocline, which formed between 50 and 70 million years ago during the Laramide Orogeny.

Climate
Spring and fall are the most favorable seasons to visit Jailhouse Rock. According to the Köppen climate classification system, it is located in a Cold semi-arid climate zone, which is defined by the coldest month having an average mean temperature below , and at least 50% of the total annual precipitation being received during the spring and summer.

See also

 Colorado Plateau
 Geology of the Capitol Reef area

References

External links
 Capitol Reef National Park National Park Service
 Weather Forecast: Jailhouse Rock

Mountains of Utah
Capitol Reef National Park
Mountains of Wayne County, Utah
Sandstone formations of the United States
Colorado Plateau
Buttes of Utah
North American 1000 m summits